The Bondum language, Bondum Dom, is a Dogon language spoken in Mali. It is closest to Dogul Dogon, though not enough for mutual intelligibility. Dialects are Kindjim and Nadjamba.

References

Sources
 .
 

Dogon languages
Languages of Mali